The Melbourne railway network comprises 16 railway lines organised into six groups and is operated by Metro Trains Melbourne. The first section of the network opened in 1854 making the Melbourne metropolitan rail network the oldest rail system in Australia. Most of the network is above ground, with the main underground section being in the City Loop. 

There are 220 suburban railway stations that are currently operational in Melbourne. In addition to the stations currently opened there are an additional 73 are closed to passengers and 19 more used as heritage/tourist railways. Most stations on the network provide some sort of transport connections. Bus connections are common at most suburban stations. Stations in the inner suburbs and the central business district additionally may offer tram connection. However, not all stations offer transport connections. This is most commonly seen in the outer parts of the city.

The network is broken up into broken up into two Myki ticketing zones (some stations are in the overlap between the two zones, where tickets for either zone may be used). These zones determine how much it would cost to travel from one station to another, with cross zone travel costing more than traveling within the same zone.

Stations

Future Stations

Network Map

Heritage and tourist railways

See also 
Railways in Melbourne
List of closed Melbourne railway stations
List of proposed Melbourne rail extensions
List of regional railway stations in Victoria

Related 
List of suburban and commuter rail systems
Transportation in Australia

References

External links 
Public Transport Victoria – official website of Victoria's public transport
Vicsig – Victorian railways information
Victorian Railway Stations
Accessibility features at suburban railway stations

Railway stations
Melb
Railway stations
Lists of commuter rail stations